Aleksandr Arkadyevich Zakarlyuka (born 24 June 1995) is a Russian professional footballer who plays as a forward.

Club career
He made his professional debut in the Russian Professional Football League for FC Zenit-2 St. Petersburg on 15 July 2013 in a game against FC Tosno.

He made his Russian Premier League debut on 21 March 2015 for FC Arsenal Tula in a game against PFC CSKA Moscow.

References

External links

 

1995 births
Living people
Sportspeople from Kohtla-Järve
Russian footballers
Russian Premier League players
FC Arsenal Tula players
JK Narva Trans players
Meistriliiga players
Association football forwards
FC Volga Nizhny Novgorod players
Expatriate footballers in Estonia
Russian expatriate footballers
FC Zenit-2 Saint Petersburg players
Russian expatriate sportspeople in Estonia